Wire-flying is a theatrical stunt which involves suspending an actor from high-tension wires, normally with a harness concealed under the costume, to simulate the action of flying or falling, especially in the presence of other actors. When other actors are not in the scene, a visual effect would more often be used to simulate this for reasons of both safety and cost.

Wire-flying has been done in film, television, and occasionally live theatre for decades. As Superman, George Reeves was attached to wires for dramatic aerial exits.

References 

Special effects